The 1939 Princeton Tigers football team was an American football team that represented Princeton University as an independent during the 1939 college football season. In its second season under head coach Tad Wieman, the team compiled a 7–1 record and outscored opponents by a total of 132 to 65. Princeton played its 1939 home games at Palmer Stadium in Princeton, New Jersey.

Princeton was ranked No. 19 in the AP Poll issued prior to its final game against Navy. Despite defeating Navy by a 28–0 score, the Tigers dropped out of the final AP Poll. Princeton's sole loss was to the 1939 Cornell Big Red football team that finished the season undefeated and ranked No. 4 in the final AP Poll.

Tackle Bob Tierney was Princeton's team captain. Guard James H. Worth received the John Prentiss Poe Cup, the team's highest award.

Schedule

References

Princeton
Princeton Tigers football seasons
Princeton Tigers football